Piper Lake is a natural lake in South Dakota, in the United States.

Piper Lake has the name of Albert Piper, a pioneer who settled there.

References

Lakes of South Dakota
Bodies of water of Beadle County, South Dakota